Bybee House is a historic building located south of Winchester, Kentucky, United States. The original part of the house was two rooms that were constructed of logs. A frame addition was added to the single-pen log core, creating a central-passage house house. Log structures were prominent in this part of Clark County as the economy was much more modest than elsewhere. The 1¾-story structure features stone chimneys on the exterior and simple Greek Revival details on the interior. The house was listed on the National Register of Historic Places in 1979.

References

Houses in Clark County, Kentucky
National Register of Historic Places in Clark County, Kentucky
Houses on the National Register of Historic Places in Kentucky
Winchester, Kentucky
Log houses in the United States
Log buildings and structures on the National Register of Historic Places in Kentucky
Central-passage houses
Greek Revival architecture in Kentucky